The southern giant pouched rat (Cricetomys ansorgei) is a species of rodent in the family Nesomyidae. It is distributed in the savannah of East and Southern Africa.

Synonyms
A large number of synonyms have been noted for this species. They include:
 Cricetomys adventor Thomas and Wroughton, 1907
 Cricetomys cosensi Hinton, 1919
 Cricetomys cunctator Thomas and Wroughton, 1908
 Cricetomys elgonis Thomas, 1910
 Cricetomys enguvi Heller, 1912
 Cricetomys haagneri Roberts, 1926
 Cricetomys kenyensis Osgood, 1910
 Cricetomys luteus Dollman, 1911
 Cricetomys microtis Lönnberg, 1917
 Cricetomys osgoodi Heller, 1912
 Cricetomys raineyi Heller, 1912
 Cricetomys selindensis Roberts, 1946
 Cricetomys vaughanjonesi St. Leger, 1937
 Cricetomys viator Thomas, 1904

Distribution 
The southern giant pouched rat is widely distributed in mainly tropical regions of southern Africa, notably Zimbabwe, Kenya, Tanzania, Zambia, and the Democratic Republic of Congo.

Description 
The southern giant pouched rat is a large rodent, with males larger than females. Adult males typically weigh , while females weigh . The pouches for which these rats are named consist of oversized cheek-pouches. These oversized cheek pouches are often used to transport large food-finds back to their burrows for storage. They have dark brown to reddish fur on their backs and a pale belly. The tail is bi-colored, brown with white at the distal third of the tail.

Females have small litters, usually between 1-3 young at a time. Males scent mark using cheek and anogenital rubbing, as well as urine, and appear to preferentially mark unfamiliar locations.

Taxonomy 
An analysis of cranial head measurements, as well as mitochondrial cytochrome b phylogeny shows C. ansorgei to be distinct from other members of the genus Cricetomys. C. ansorgei may have a largely-undescribed sister species that resides west of the Congo River. Previously, many animals described as Cricetomys gambianus may have instead been C. ansorgei based on this new characterization.

Use by humans 
The southern African giant pouched rat is used in tuberculosis detection, and in locating landmines through initiatives by APOPO. It is also popular as bushmeat.

References

Further reading
Kingdon, J. 1984. East African mammals: An atlas of evolution in Africa. (Hares and Rodents). University of Chicago Press, Chicago, 2B:550–554.
Kingdon, J. 1997. The Kingdon field guide to African mammals, AP Natural World Academic Press, Harcourt Brace & Company, San Diego, p. 199-200.
Nowak, R. M. 1999. Walker's Mammals of the World. Sixth ed. Johns Hopkins University Press, Baltimore, 2:1344–1346, 1495–1496.
Swynnerton, G. H., and R. W. Hayman. 1951. A checklist of the land mammals of the Tanganyika Territory and the Zanzibar Protectorate. Journal of the East African Natural History Society, 20(6):274–392.

Cricetomys
Rodents of Africa
Mammals of the Democratic Republic of the Congo
Mammals of Kenya
Mammals of Tanzania
Mammals of Zambia
Mammals of Zimbabwe
Mammals described in 1904
Taxa named by Oldfield Thomas